Myra M. Hart is a founder of Staples Inc. She graduated from Cornell University with a B.A. in 1962 and a Harvard M.B.A. 1981. She obtained a DBA from Harvard University in 1995.

Biography
She was a founding member of Staples Inc., the office superstore. She served as a professor of management practice at Harvard Business School until retiring in 2006. She co-authored four books and developed more than 60 Harvard Business School cases.

In 1999, Hart was elected to the Cornell board of trustees and serves on the investment committee and the Committee on Alumni Affairs and Development. Hart is a director of the National Foundation for Women Business Owners, on the corporate boards of directors of Kraft and Office Depot, and on the Board of Advisors of AbsolutelyNew Inc.. Hart is a member of the Boston Club and the MIT Enterprise Council.

References

Cornell University alumni
Harvard Business School alumni
Year of birth missing (living people)
Staples Inc. people
Harvard Business School faculty
Kraft Foods people
Living people